Shaheb Name Golam is a Bangladeshi Bengali-language film written and directed by Raju Chowdhury, produced and distributed by Md Khorshed Alam Khosru. It is a family drama-based film, starring Shakib Khan and Moushumi in the lead roles. It also features Sahara, Nirob, Racy, Misha Sawdagor, Omar Sani, Danny Sidak, Nagma in supporting roles.

Cast
 Shakib Khan as Munna / Shaheb
 Moushumi as Ratna Chowdhury
 Sahara as Roza
 Nirab
 Racy
 Misha Sawdagor
 Omar Sani
 Danny Sidak
 Nagma

Crew
 Director: Raju Chowdhury
 Producer: Md Khorshed Alam Khosru
 Story: Raju Chowdhury
 Script: Raju Chowdhury
 Music: Emon Saha
 Lyrics: Kabir Bokul
 Distributor: Md Khorshed Alam Khosru

Music

The film music was directed by Emon Saha.

Soundtrack

Home media
The DVD and VCD of the film were released in 2011 by Anupom.

References

2009 films
2009 drama films
Bengali-language Bangladeshi films
Bangladeshi drama films
Films scored by Emon Saha
2000s Bengali-language films